Tara is an Aboriginal community in the Northern Territory of Australia, located about 243 km north of Alice Springs, on Kaytetye land.

References 

Aboriginal communities in the Northern Territory